The Sea Ferret was a submarine-launched aerial reconnaissance drone under development by the United States Navy, designed to 
be launched from within a Sub-Harpoon missile canister and controlled by a submerged submarine to provide covert surveillance, weapons targeting, choke point interdiction, and battle damage assessment.

While its primary mission was reconnaissance, Sea Ferret was a weapon, carrying a nine-kilogram (20 lb) warhead, capable of destroying
smaller targets like command centers and surface-to-air missile launchers.

Sea Ferret was under development by Northrop Grumman Corporation since 1991, and was successfully demonstrated
onboard Asheville (SSN-758).

General characteristics
 Weight: 145 lb (66 kg)
 Length: 75 in (1.9 m) long
 Range: 370 nautical miles (685 km)
 Loiter: 2 hours
 Speed: 300 knots (550 km/h) maximum, 80 knots (148 km/h) minimum
 Warhead: 20 lb (9 kg)

External links
 Globalsecurity.org - Sea Ferret

United States military reconnaissance aircraft